The 2010 New York City Marathon was the 41st running of the annual marathon race in New York City, United States, which took place on Sunday, November 7. Sponsored by ING Group, the competition was the fifth World Marathon Major of 2010 and an IAAF Gold Label Road Race. A record 45,344 people were entered into the race. Ethiopian runner Gebregziabher Gebremariam won the men's race in a time of two hours, eight minutes and fourteen seconds on his debut performance over the distance. Edna Kiplagat of Kenya took first place in the women's race with her winning time of 2:28:20.

The pre-race favorite for the men's competition was Haile Gebrselassie, the marathon world record holder. However, he dropped out in the final  of the race due to a knee injury and later declared that he was retiring from competition, bringing a close to one of the most successful careers in long-distance running which included eight world titles and 27 world best marks.

In the wheelchair races, Great Britain's David Weir (1:37:29) and America's Tatyana McFadden (2:02:22) won the men's and women's divisions, respectively. In the handcycle race, Americans Dane Pilon (1:21:23) and Helene Hines (2:02:16) were the winners.

Among the fun runners in the marathon event was Edison Peña, a Chilean miner who was saved from the 2010 Copiapó mining accident the previous month. He was invited to the competition as he had used running as a means of maintaining hope during the 69-day period he spent underground. He completed the distance in 5 hours, 40 minutes, 51 seconds.

A total of 44,704 runners finished the race, 28,661 men and 16,043 women.

Results

Men

 Abderrahim Goumri of Morocco was the original fourth place athlete in 2:10:51, but was subsequently disqualified due to doping.

Women

Inga Abitova of Russia was initially fourth in a time of 2:29:17, but her result was subsequently annulled due to doping.

Wheelchair men

Wheelchair women

Handcycle men

Handcycle women

References

Results
ING New York City Marathon 2010. New York Road Runners. Retrieved 2020-05-09.
Men's results. Association of Road Racing Statisticians. Retrieved 2020-04-11.
Women's results. Association of Road Racing Statisticians. Retrieved 2020-04-11.

External links

New York Road Runners website

2010
New York City
Marathon
New York City Marathon